Hans Eduard Suess (December 16, 1909 – September 20, 1993) was an Austrian born American physical chemist and nuclear physicist. He was a grandson of the Austrian geologist Eduard Suess.

Career
Suess earned his Ph.D. in chemistry from the University of Vienna in 1935 under the supervision of Philipp Gross. During World War II, he was part of a team of German scientists studying nuclear power and was advisor to the production of heavy water in a Norwegian plant (see Operation Gunnerside).

After the war, he collaborated on the shell model of the atomic nucleus with future (1963) Nobel Prize winner Hans Jensen.

In 1950, Suess emigrated to the United States. He did research in the field of cosmochemistry, investigating the abundance of certain elements in meteorites with Harold Urey (Nobel Prize in Chemistry, 1934) at the University of Chicago. In 1955, Suess was recruited for the faculty of Scripps Institution of Oceanography, and in 1958 he became one of the four founding faculty members of the University of California, San Diego. He remained at UCSD as Professor until 1977 and as Emeritus Professor thereafter. He established a laboratory at UCSD for carbon-14 determinations, where he trained students including Ellen R.M. Druffel, now the Fred Kavli Professor of Earth System Science at University of California, Irvine.

Suess's most recent research was focused on the distribution of carbon-14 and tritium in the oceans and atmosphere. On basis of radiocarbon analyses of annual growth-rings of trees he contributed to
 the calibration of the radiocarbon dating scale, and
 the study of the magnitude of the dilution of atmospheric radiocarbon by carbon dioxide from fossil fuels burned since the industrial revolution. This dilution is known as the Suess effect (see articles about the anthropogenic greenhouse effect).

The mineral suessite, a Fe, Ni-silicide in Enstatit-Chondrites, is named after him.

Death
On September 20, 1993, Suess died in a La Jolla retirement home.

Name confusion
Suess was frequently confused—by the US Postal Service among others—with a contemporary, the famed children's writer Dr. Seuss (Theodor Seuss Geisel), when both men resided in La Jolla, California.  The two names have been posthumously linked as well: both men's personal papers are housed in the Geisel Library at the University of California, San Diego.

Notes

References

A Biographical Memoir, from the National Academy Press
A Biographical Memoir, from the National Academy Press
Genesis Mission page
Suess-effect

Robert Jungk in Brighter Than a Thousand Suns (Middlesex: Penguin Books, 1958), quotes Suess about the production of heavy water by the Vemork plant. From page 110: "... Jomar Brun, a former technical manager of the [...] heavy water works at Rjukan in Norway [...] stated that he had been told by Hans Suess, the German atomic expert employed there, that production [...] could not attain the dimensions important for war production in much less than five years." Jomar Brun fled to Sweden after the occupation by German troops in 1940. Brun's letters (1950–1987), archived in  Hans Suess Papers:Series 2, Correspondence:b4/f29, contain a discussion of secret war operations and Brun's role in the production of heavy water.
Hitler's Sunken Secret, a NOVA production airing in November 2005 undertakes a forensics approach to evaluate the heavy water threat.
 Brun, Jomar. Brennpunkt Vemork 1940-1945. , 119 pages (1985), Universitetsforlaget.
 

1909 births
1993 deaths
Austrian nuclear physicists
Austrian emigrants to the United States
Nuclear program of Nazi Germany
Austrian physical chemists
American physical chemists
American nuclear physicists
Members of the United States National Academy of Sciences
Scientists from Vienna
Recipients of the V. M. Goldschmidt Award